Marithibbe Gowda (born 1 July 1959) is an Indian political leader who was the Deputy chairman of Karnataka Legislative Council from 1 August 2015 to 21 June 2018 (after death of Vimala Gowda) and he is current Member of the Karnataka Legislative Council from 22 June 2012.

See also

References

1959 births
Living people
Janata Dal (Secular) politicians
Members of the Karnataka Legislative Council